Feminist bookstores sell material relating to women's issues, gender, and sexuality. These stores served as some of the earliest open spaces for feminist community building and organizing.

Prior to the spread of feminist bookstores, bookselling was a trade dominated by white men in the United States. There was a lack of awareness and interest within this bookstore leadership to meet the demands for woman-centered literature being raised by feminists at the time. Though some bookstores featured small sections of women's literature or feminist books, these were limited and did not provide the range and depth representative of this category, treating topics not centered around men as an extra section of bookshops rather than an integral part.

History 
Feminist bookstores emerged within this context as spaces not only for buying books, but building communities for women, lesbians, and feminists more broadly as part of the growing feminist movement of the mid-20th century. These independent bookstores formed a network across the United States and abroad during the 1960s and after as part of the second-wave feminist movement. Sisterwrite, Britain's first feminist bookshop, opened in 1978; it was run as a collective.

In addition to their function as booksellers, feminist bookstores served as places of learning and organizing for social change. Many feminist bookstores were collectively run by boards of women in a non-hierarchical structure. This was an anti-capitalist business model in line with second-wave feminists' belief that system change was needed in order to create meaningful change in women's lives.

The call for more diverse types of feminist and lesbian spaces took place in-part because queer businesses and locations for community building were few and far between, with the notable exception of the gay bar scene. Even within explicitly LBGT (lesbian, gay, bisexual, trans) spaces lesbians were ostracized, in addition to the broader societal discrimination which they faced. Feminist bookstores were created in part to combat this homophobia and lesbophobia, in response to the lack of safe spaces for lesbians and bisexual women.

Establishment of Gender and Women's Studies

Feminist bookstores were essential to the establishment and growth of feminist studies in the academy. By consolidating feminist literature and providing spaces for open discussion of issues relating to women, these bookshops became incubators for feminist intellectuals. Critical race and gender theories were produced in part by these intellectuals and activists, and feminist bookstores were key to developing the content necessary for the field to be established in the academy. Because these bookstores were open to the public and provided resources through the products sold as well as the women who ran the shops, people who had never had access to that knowledge before then had access. This enabled a more widespread call, first for women's studies and then for gender studies, as academic departments across the nation.

Issues with and responses to feminist bookstores 
Though many bookstores were intentional about creating a board of owners that was diverse so as to represent diverse experiences of being a woman, white feminism was a present issue within some leadership. In the case of A Woman's Place bookstore, an alleged lack of understanding of intersectionality was suggested as a cause of the eventual deterioration of the cooperative board and a high-profile legal debate.

One way women of color dealt with this environment was to open businesses run by and centered around their own experiences and made to raise up experiences of other women of color. Kitchen Table Press is one such example; this was a publishing company that produced literature exclusively written by women of color from all backgrounds and then sold to the public, often through feminist bookstores.

References

 
Feminist bookstores
Second-wave feminism
Independent bookstores